Dayton Superior Corporation is a global company serving the nonresidential concrete construction industry. Dayton Superior has four main product lines of Concrete Accessories, Chemicals, Forming, and Paving with 117 patents for such products. The headquarters is in Dayton, Ohio. There are 30 other office/warehouse locations throughout the US, Canada, Colombia, and Panama.

History 
Dayton Sure-Grip & Shore was founded in 1924 by Art & Carl Kinnenger with help from Charles Danis and Fred Kramer. Carl Kinnenger held the patent on the snap tie design (to hold formwork together) and Dayton Sure-Grip & Shore was licensed to sell it in the U.S. out of their Downtown Dayton location.

In 1953, Danis Hunt Construction acquired Dayton Sure-Grip. After beginning bar support production in 1959, Sure-Grip, Inc is founded in 1960, and the company relocated to Miamisburg, Ohio. In 1975, Dayton Sure-Grip purchased C&M Chemical Co. out of Sycamore, Illinois, beginning their production of chemicals. After the purchase of Superior Concrete Accessories in 1982, the company changed their name to Dayton Superior Corporation.

A series of acquisitions followed, leading to international expansion (purchased Superior Concrete Accessories of Toronto and Cogan Wire Company of Montreal), and the purchase of Symons Corporation. Symons specialized in form systems, and manufactured shoring, formliners, and chemicals, drastically expanding Dayton Superior's number of products offered.

In 2006, Dayton Superior went public (NASDAQ: DSUP). The stint in the public markets did not last long, as the company filed for Chapter 11 bankruptcy. The company emerged from bankruptcy later that year with significantly less debt and a new capital management group in Oaktree Capital Management. The company then relocated to its current headquarters in Miamisburg, Ohio in 2010

Milestones and acquisitions timeline 
1901 – Symons founded
1924 – Dayton Sure Grip & Shore founded
1982 – Superior Concrete Accessories acquired – company name changed to Dayton Superior Corporation
1995 – Acquired Dur-O-Wal, Inc. (masonry)
1996 – Acquired Steel Structures, Inc. (paving)
1996 – IPO – Shares traded on the New York Stock Exchange
1997 – Acquired Symons Corporation (forming) and Richmond Screw Anchor (accessories)
1999 – Acquired Cempro (chemicals)
2000 – Acquired Conspec (chemicals)
2000 – Purchased by Odyssey Investment Partners
2001 – Acquired Aztec (accessories)
2003 – Acquired Safway (forming)
2006 – IPO – Shares traded on Nasdaq
2009 – Successfully exited bankruptcy led by Oaktree Capital Management
2010 – Sold Dur-O-Wal (masonry)
2010 – Acquired Unitex (chemicals), Universal Building Products (accessories), and Block Heavy & Highway (paving)
2014 - Opened The Innovation Center at Corporate Miamisburg

References

External links
 
 Forbes.com
 Bizjournals.com
 Karell.com
 Forconstructionpros.com

1924 establishments in Ohio
Building materials companies of the United States
Companies based in Dayton, Ohio
Chemical companies established in 1924
Companies formerly listed on the Nasdaq
Manufacturing companies established in 1924